Mewa Shah was a Sufi and  He was buried in Mewa Shah Graveyard in SITE Town, Karachi, Sindh, Pakistan. 

In the 19th century Sufi Mewa Shah struggled against the British colonial rule in Karachi. He was jailed and eventually exiled by the British. According to legend, Mewa Shah boarded the ship taking him into exile, said his prayers on the waves of the Arabian Sea and mounted a large fish, which took him back to the shores of Karachi.

References

Sufis of Sindh
Sindhi people
History of Sindh
People from Karachi
People from British India
Burials at Mewa Shah Graveyard